The 1995 IGA Tennis Classic was a women's tennis tournament played on indoor hard courts at The Greens Country Club in Oklahoma City, Oklahoma in the United States that was part of Tier III of the 1995 WTA Tour. It was the tenth edition of the tournament and was held from February 13 through February 19, 1995. First-seeded Brenda Schultz won the singles title and earned $26,500 first-prize money.

Finals

Singles

 Brenda Schultz defeated  Elena Likhovtseva 6–1, 6–2
 It was Schultz's 2nd title of the year and the 7th of her career.

Doubles

 Nicole Arendt /  Laura Golarsa defeated  Katrina Adams /  Brenda Schultz 6–4, 6–3
 It was Arendt's 1st title of the year and the 3rd of her career. It was Golarsa's only title of the year and the 5th of her career.

External links
 ITF tournament edition details
 Tournament draws

IGA Classic
U.S. National Indoor Championships
IGA Tennis Classic
IGA Tennis Classic
IGA Tennis Classic